Charadrophila is a genus of flowering plants in the family Stilbaceae described as a genus in 1899. There is only one known species, Charadrophila capensis, native to the Cape Province region of South Africa.

References

Stilbaceae
Monotypic Lamiales genera
Endemic flora of South Africa
Plants described in 1899